The East Zone 1 is an Administrative Zone of São Paulo, Brazil.

References

Geography of São Paulo

pt:Zona leste de São Paulo